The 1991 Chilean telethon was the tenth version of the solidarity campaign conducted in Chile, which took place on 29 and 30 November 1991. The theme of this version was "Thanks to You" as a way of thanks to the Chilean public who had participated in the campaign for 13 years.

It was the last edition of the Chilean telethon that was identified with a cardinal number as from the next edition it began to be identified as Teletón and the year of the broadcast.

The final total on the night, released by the Banco de Chile and read by Javier Miranda (TV host) was CL$ 1,584,289,345. The final collection of the telethon was CL$ 1,803,923,485. The poster girl was Angela Castro.

Sponsors

Artists

National singers 
  Myriam Hernández
  Luis Jara
  Gloria Simonetti
  Héctor Galaz
  Giolito y Su Combo
  José Luis Arce
  La Sonora de Tommy Rey
  Síndrome
  Se Busca
  Los Clásicos
  Zalo Reyes
  Soledad Guerrero
  Fernando Ubiergo
  Sonora Palacios
  Inti-Illimani
  Cecilia Echeñique
  Los Huasos Quincheros
  Lorena
  Congreso
  Miguelo
  Ximena Reyes
  Eduardo Valenzuela
  Hola Hola
  Rodolfo Navech
  Tito Fernández
  Nicole
  Mónica De Calixto
  Illapu
  Álvaro Scaramelli
  Guillermo Fernández
  Juan Antonio Labra
    Andrea Tessa
  Sexual Democracia
  De Kiruza
  La Ley

International Artists 
  Nydia Caro
  Lucero
  Víctor Víctor
  Sergio Dalma
  Franco Simone
  Ednita Nazario
  Braulio
  Alejandro Lerner
  Tam Tam Go
  Banda Blanca
  Ángela Carrasco

Comedians 
 Checho Hirane
 Coco Legrand
 Ricardo Meruane
 Carlos Helo
 Pepe Tapia
 Lucho Arenas

Magazine
 Raul Di Blasio (piano)
 Bafona (folklore Deputies)
 Alexandra and her ballet
 Julio Zúñiga's dance group (disabled people)

In the Children's Section 
 Pipiripao
 La Pintita
 Enza's Show
 Mini Pop
 El Profesor Rossa
 Cachureos

Transmission 
 La Red
 UCV Televisión
 Televisión Nacional de Chile
 Megavisión
 RTU University of Chile TV Networks
 Universidad Católica de Chile Televisión
 Telenorte
 Canal 8 UCV Televisión
 TV Cable Intercom

This was La Red's first telethon as participating network, and was Megavision's second under its present name.

References

External links 
 1991 Chilean telethon - Lucero
 1991 Chilean telethon - Summary
 1991 Chilean telethon - Pilsener Dorada's Advertising
 1991 Chilean telethon - Shampoo Dimensión's Advertising
 1991 Chilean telethon - Banco de Chile's Advertising

Telethon
Chilean telethons